The 2012 GCC U-23 Championship was the fourth edition of the GCC U-23 Championship. It took place in Doha, Qatar for the third consecutive time. Six nations took part. The competition was held in Doha from 1 to 11 September. Saudi Arabia won their second title after defeating Bahrain 2–0 in the final.

The group stage draw was held on 30 June 2012.

Teams
{| class="wikitable sortable"
|-
! Team
! data-sort-type="number"|Previous appearances in tournament
|-
|  || 3 (2008, 2010, 2011)
|-
|  || 3 (2008, 2010, 2011)
|-
|  (host) || 3 (2008, 2010, 2011)
|-
|   || 3 (2008, 2010, 2011)
|-
|  || 3 (2008, 2010, 2011)
|-
|   || 2 (2010, 2011)
|}

Venues

Group stage

Group A

Group B

Knockout stage
In the knockout stage, extra time and penalty shoot-out were be used to decide the winner if necessary (Regulations Articles 10.1 and 10.3).

Bracket

Fifth place play-off

Semi-finals

Third place play-off

Final

Winners

Awards
The following awards were given at the conclusion of the tournament:

Goalscorers

See also 
Arabian Gulf Cup
Arab Gulf Cup Football Federation

References

External links
GCC U-23 Championship at Goalzz

GCC U-23 Championship
2012
2012 in Asian football
2012–13 in Qatari football
2012–13 in Saudi Arabian football
2012–13 in Bahraini football
2012–13 in Omani football
2012–13 in Kuwaiti football
2012–13 in Emirati football
2012 in youth association football